Dear Death is a 2023 Indian Tamil-language romantic drama film directed by Prem Kumar and starring Santhosh Prathap, Jay and Smruthi in the lead roles. It was released on 6 January 2023.

Cast

Santhosh Prathap as Death
Jay
Smruthi
Venkatesan
Sathish
Sridhar Venkatesan
Muthamil
Juvi Arthi
Sai Jeevitha
Rakesh Karthik
Mani Bose
Mithun Rudran
Sriram G.

Production
The film was written by Sridhar Venkatesan, who had earlier made films such as 6 Athiyayam (2018) and Yen Peyar Anandhan (2020). He used the concept of showcasing the concept of 'death' as on-screen character, and used it as a hyperlink between four separate stories shown in the film. The film's first look poster was released by actor Vijay Sethupathi in August 2022. Production on the film was completed by September 2022. A trailer of the film was released in early December 2022.

The makers attempted to release the film on 30 December 2022, and held a press show earlier that week, but the film was eventually delayed by a week owing to a lack of screens.

Reception
The film was released on 6 January 2023 across Tamil Nadu. A critic form Thinaboomi gave the film a positive review, praising the film's concept. A reviewer from Thanthi TV also presented a favourable review of the film.

References

External links

2023 films
2020s Tamil-language films